Same-sex marriage has been legal in Guerrero since 31 December 2022. After the Supreme Court of Justice of the Nation ruled that same-sex marriage bans are unconstitutional nationwide under the Constitution of Mexico on 12 June 2015, officials in Guerrero began announcing plans for a collective group wedding. Governor Rogelio Ortega Martínez submitted a same-sex marriage bill to Congress on 7 July 2015 and instructed civil registrars to issue marriage licenses to same-sex couples. Legislators lamented they would have preferred to have the bill passed before marriages took place, but given the time line presented, it was unlikely. On 10 July 2015, twenty same-sex couples were married by Ortega Martínez in Acapulco.

Congress rejected same-sex marriage legislation in October 2020. Nevertheless, some municipalities continued to issue marriage licenses to same-sex couples in line with Governor Ortega Martínez's directive, and the state civil registry has been recognizing those marriages since 2016. Congress passed a same-sex marriage bill on 25 October 2022. The bill took effect upon publication in the state's official gazette on 31 December 2022.

Legal history

Background

On 12 June 2015, the Supreme Court of Justice of the Nation ruled that state bans on same-sex marriage are unconstitutional nationwide. The court's ruling is considered a "jurisprudential thesis" and did not invalidate state laws, meaning that same-sex couples denied the right to marry would still have to seek individual amparos in court. The ruling standardized the procedures for judges and courts throughout Mexico to approve all applications for same-sex marriages and made the approval mandatory. The court based its decision on Articles 1 and 4 of the Constitution of Mexico. Article 1 of the Constitution states that "any form of discrimination, based on ethnic or national origin, gender, age, disabilities, social status, medical conditions, religion, opinions, sexual orientation, marital status, or any other form, which violates the human dignity or seeks to annul or diminish the rights and freedoms of the people, is prohibited.", while Article 4 respects matrimonial equality: "Man and woman are equal under the law. The law shall protect the organization and development of the family".

The first same-sex marriage in Guerrero was announced for 28 September 2013, but did not actually occur until 5 June 2014 in the town of Teloloapan, witnessed by Mayor Ignacio Valladares. Valladares approved the couple's request for a marriage license based on the Supreme Court's 2012 ruling that prohibiting same-sex marriage is unconstitutional. However, the Civil Code of Guerrero does not allow for same-sex marriage. Lawyers for the state declared the marriage "illegal and void" and indicated that Valladares could be prosecuted. On 20 December 2014, a same-sex marriage ceremony was held in the city of Chilapa de Álvarez though the civil marriage was conducted in Iztapalapa in Mexico City. The couple expressed that they felt it was important for them to have a celebration complete with rings from their godparents, vows, and a toast with their friends and families in the city where they live and work, to help other same-sex couples gain societal acceptance.

Legislative action
A bill to establish civil unions was debated in the Congress of Guerrero in 2009, but the legislation stalled and was not voted on. In 2014, as Coahuila had recently legalized same-sex marriage, LGBT rights organizations in Guerrero began pressing Congress to approve same-sex marriage and adoption. On 7 July 2015, Governor Rogelio Ortega Martínez submitted a same-sex marriage bill to Congress. On 20 May 2016, Deputy Vicario Castrejón from the Institutional Revolutionary Party (PRI) said the bill would be voted on "soon", but this did not happen, and the bill, as with the previous legislation, stalled.

The July 2018 elections resulted in the National Regeneration Movement (MORENA), a party supporting same-sex marriage, winning the majority of legislative seats in Guerrero. In November 2018, Deputy Moisés Reyes Sandoval introduced legislation to legalize same-sex marriage in Guerrero. The bill was rejected by Congress in October 2020 in a 15–23 vote, with several MORENA deputies voting against, despite having been elected on a party platform supporting same-sex marriage. Reyes Sandoval announced his intention to challenge this decision to the Mexican Supreme Court, saying that "whether they [conservatives] like it or not they will be gay marriage [in Guerrero]". In September 2022, Deputy Héctor Fernando Agüero García introduced a new same-sex marriage bill to Congress. The bill was passed 38–6 with 2 abstentions on 25 October 2022.The bill took effect upon publication in the state's official gazette on 31 December 2022.

Gubernatorial directive (2015)
On 25 June 2015, following the Supreme Court's ruling striking down district same-sex marriage bans on a "jurisprudential" basis, the state civil registry announced that it had planned a collective same-sex marriage ceremony for 10 July 2015 and indicated that there would have to be a change to the law to allow same-sex marriage, passed through the state Congress before the official commencement. The registry announced more details of their plan, advising that only select registration offices in the state would be able to participate in the collective marriage event. Governor Ortega Martínez instructed civil agencies to issue marriage licenses to same-sex couples regardless of the state ban. On 10 July 2015, 20 same-sex couples were married by Ortega Martínez in Acapulco, even though Congress had not yet amended state law to permit same-sex marriage. On 12 July 2015, the civil registry of Tecpán de Galeana announced that the civil registration offices in the municipality which could accept marriage applications from same-sex couples were Tecpán (which is the seat of the municipality), San Luis de la Loma, Tenexpa and Papanoa.

On 13 January 2016, the director of the civil registry of Acapulco, Ricardo Martínez, claimed that the 20 same-sex marriages that occurred on 10 July 2015 in Acapulco were void as per state law. On 13 February 2016, a day before mass Valentine's Day weddings were planned statewide, the director of the state civil registry, María Inés Hurta Pegueros, said that municipalities are free to marry same-sex couples if they wish, and criticized Martínez and other civil registrars across the state for not allowing same-sex marriages. Huerta Pegueros said any same-sex marriage conducted in Guerrero will be legally valid. As of 2016, municipalities including the capital city of Chilpancingo de los Bravo, Taxco de Alarcón, Tecpán de Galeana and Zihuatanejo de Azueta were marrying same-sex couples. In March 2016, an LGBT group said they were considering filing a lawsuit to have all municipalities perform same-sex marriages.

Marriage statistics
By September 2015, approximately 60 same-sex marriages had occurred in the state, mostly in the municipalities of Chilpancingo de los Bravo, Acapulco (married by Governor Ortega Martínez) and Zihuatanejo de Azueta.
Guerrero is the only state without marriages conducted under amparo.

Public opinion
A 2017 opinion poll conducted by  found that 50% of Guerrero residents supported same-sex marriage, while 46% were opposed.

According to a 2018 survey by the National Institute of Statistics and Geography, 54% of the Guerrero public opposed same-sex marriage.

See also
 Same-sex marriage in Mexico
 LGBT rights in Mexico
 Recognition of same-sex unions in the Americas

Notes

References

Guerrero
Guerrero
2015 in LGBT history
2022 in LGBT history